Douglas Charles Dick (born 9 July 1868 in Kirktonholm – 24 June 1940 in Kilmarnock) was a Scottish footballer who played as a striker. Dick was a regular in the Liverpool team during the 1893–94 season. He played 11 games during the season scoring twice. Before joining Liverpool he played for Rangers and Morton.

Career 
Dick signed for Morton in August 1891, before moving to Rangers the following year. He made 2 league appearances and scored 1 goal in the 1892–93 season. He moved back to Morton before the end of the season. He made 2 league appearances in the 1893–94 season for Morton. The first was on 16 September and the second on 30 September, a game in which he got into a fight with John McPherson of Cowlairs, and both players left the pitch of their own accord, without being ordered to by the referee. Soon after, Dick signed for Third Lanarck and made 1 appearance, on 14 October 1893. Dick actually signed for Liverpool the day before this match, but was illegible to play until 20 October. He made his debut on 28 October against Woolwich Arsenal and went to make a further 10 league appearances for Liverpool, scoring 2 goals. At the end of the 1893–94 season, Dick moved back to Morton, but did not play until the 1895–96 season, in which he made 2 appearances.

After retiring, Dick was director of Kilmarnock for 10 years and was also chairman of the club in 1931 and 1932. He was also head of a motor company, Dick Brothers (Motors) Ltd, and died on 24 June 1940 at the age of 71.

References

1868 births
Year of death missing
Scottish footballers
English Football League players
Liverpool F.C. players
Rangers F.C. players
Footballers from Greenock
Third Lanark A.C. players
Place of birth missing
Association football forwards
Scottish Football League players